Angel Eyes is a 1965 studio album by Dave Brubeck and his quartet of music by Matt Dennis. The album peaked at 122 on the Billboard 200.  The cover features a photo of model Terry Reno, who also appeared on the cover of My Favorite Things.

Reception

The album was reviewed by Scott Yanow at Allmusic who wrote that the songs "...are given superior and swinging treatments with fine solos from Brubeck and altoist Paul Desmond."

Track listing
''All music composed by Matt Dennis, lyricists indicated
 "Let's Get Away from It All" (Tom Adair) - 3:55
 "Violets for Your Furs" (Adair) - 5:53
 "Angel Eyes" (Earl Brent) - 7:25
 "Will You Still Be Mine?" (Adair) - 5:24
 "Everything Happens to Me" (Adair) - 5:49
 "Little Man With a Candy Cigar" (Frank Killduff) - 3:37
 "The Night We Called It a Day" (Adair) - 6:11

Personnel
Dave Brubeck - piano
Paul Desmond - alto saxophone
Gene Wright - double bass
Joe Morello - drums
Teo Macero - producer

References

1965 albums
Albums produced by Teo Macero
Columbia Records albums
Dave Brubeck albums